Bryan Young (born 11 June 1981) is a retired Irish rugby union footballer. He played for Ulster and Cavalieri. He is currently fitness and nutrition coach with Ballymena

Young is from Ballymena, County Antrim, Northern Ireland. The middle of three children his elder brother Robert is the current captain of Ballymena. Bryan, nicknamed "Bear" is regarded as technically one of the best scrummaging props.

While Young made his Ulster debut in April 2002 against Connacht, it was not until the 2005–06 Celtic League that he really made his breakthrough, playing in all but one match that season. Young's performances for Ulster brought him to the attention of the national selectors and he was part of the Ireland squad that toured New Zealand and Australia in June 2006 where he won his first two international caps coming on as a replacement in two of the tests. He was in Ireland's squad at the 2007 Rugby World Cup.

References

External links
Ulster profile
Ireland profile

Expatriate rugby union players from Northern Ireland
Ireland international rugby union players
Ballymena R.F.C. players
Ulster Rugby players
Cavalieri Prato players
1981 births
Living people
Ireland Wolfhounds international rugby union players
Rugby union players from Ballymena
Rugby union props
Expatriate sportspeople from Northern Ireland in Italy
Expatriate rugby union players in Italy